Sony Pictures Television Nonfiction (formerly known as CKX, Inc., CORE Media Group, Inc. and Industrial Media, LLC) is an American company founded on February 7, 2005, that owns and develops entertainment content and intellectual property.

History

Sports Entertainment Enterprises, Inc. era
Before its founding in 2005, and during a period from 1986 to August 2002, the company operated a franchise of golf equipment, formerly known as Sports Entertainment Enterprises. In August 2002 the company sold all of its former assets. From September 2002 to February 2005, the company's main priority was to pursue a transaction with a business enterprise.

On March 25, 2005, Sports Entertainment Enterprises, Inc. d/b/a CKX, Inc.'s shareholders voted overwhelmingly to change the company's name to CKX, Inc., to change the company's state of incorporation from Colorado to Delaware, and to increase the number of the company's authorized shares of capital stock from 105,000,000 to 275,000,000. The company's common stock would continue to trade under the stock symbol CKXE.

CKX, Inc. era
In 2005, it bought British company 19 Entertainment from Simon Fuller, who subsequently joined the company's board. With the purchase, the company acquired a majority share of the rights to the Idol series, including American Idol and So You Think You Can Dance, as well as Pop Idol in Great Britain and numerous other international versions. Later that year it bought an entertainment agency, with artists on its roster such as Robin Williams, Billy Crystal, and Woody Allen.

On February 7, 2005, the company bought 85% interest in the entities which own and/or control the commercial utilization of the name, image, and likeness of Elvis Presley, the operation of the Graceland museum and related attractions, as well as revenue derived from Elvis Presley's television specials, films, and certain of his recorded musical works, from the trust of Lisa Marie Presley.

On April 11, 2006, CKX, Inc. announced it has acquired an 80% interest in the name and likeness of Muhammad Ali. The transaction included the rights to the name, image, and likeness of Mr. Ali, certain trademarks owned by Mr. Ali and his affiliates, and the rights to all existing Ali license agreements. Mr. Ali, through affiliates, would retain a 20% interest in the business, which will be operated through a newly formed company named G.O.A.T. LLC.

On March 7, 2007, CKX, Inc. announced its subsidiary, Muhammad Ali Enterprises LLC, acquired approximately 11,000 photographs of boxer Muhammad Ali from photographer Ken Regan. The images would be immediately available for licensing and editorial purposes.

On June 1, 2007, CKX, Inc. announced it entered into a series of transactions that would result in the sale of the Company at a price of $13.75 per share in cash and the distribution to CKX stockholders of shares in FX Luxury Realty, LLC, an affiliate of Robert F.X. Sillerman. The total value for the takeover bid between Fuller and Sillerman would value the company at $1.3bn, but their attempt failed due to its timing coinciding with the start of the Global Credit Crunch.

On May 7, 2010, CKX, Inc. announced Robert F.X. Sillerman had resigned as Chairman and Chief Executive Officer of the company and from the company's board, effective immediately. Still holding 21% of the shares, he began working with One Equity Partners on a $550m-$560m takeover bid. In May, Fuller teamed up with former Barclays Capital executive Roger Jenkins, creating a $1Bn fund. They propose as their first purchase CKX, at a bid level of $600m. On the current share price, CKX is valued at $395m, with $101m of debt and $55m of cash at the end of first quarter 2010. However, in 2010-10-27, CKX, Inc. announced it was no longer discussing a potential sale of the company or of a controlling stake in the company.

On May 10, 2011, CKX, Inc. it has entered into a definitive merger agreement to be acquired by an affiliate of Apollo Global Management ("Apollo"). The company was to be sold in $5.50 per Common Share, for total $560 million. In 2011-06-16, CKX Entertainment Offeror, LLC (f/k/a Colonel Offeror Sub, LLC) ("Offeror") and CKX, Inc. ("CKX") announced the successful completion of the acquisition offer of  approximately 50,819,769 Common Shares, with offering period set to expire at 5:00 p.m., New York City time, on 2011-06-20. In 2011-06-21, Offeror and CKX announced the successful completion of the tender offer by Offeror.

On June 21, 2011, CKX Entertainment, Inc. and CKX, Inc. announced the successful completion of parent's acquisition of CKX, with parent being an acquisition entity controlled by investment funds managed by affiliates of Apollo Global Management, LLC.

CORE Media Group, Inc. era
On May 31, 2012, CORE Media Group, Inc. announced its own launch in the same day, a newly branded version of the company formerly known as CKX.

On November 19, 2013, it was announced that CORE Media Group had sold its stake in Elvis Presley Enterprises and Muhammad Ali Enterprises.

On May 15, 2014, Apollo and 21st Century Fox announced a joint venture to combine 21st Century Fox's Shine Group and Apollo's Endemol and CORE Media Group.

As a result of bankruptcy in 2016, CORE transferred assets to a new corporation, NEG Holdings LLC, which does business as CORE Media Group.

As CORE Media Group, they created the game-show Caraoke Showdown, along with Alevy Productions. The series aired in 2017 on Spike and was hosted by comedian and actor Craig Robinson. CORE recently created the wildlife animal rescue series Vet Gone Wild for Animal Planet, which began airing June 10, 2018. The show features veterinarian Dr. Chris Brown, well known for his Australian Vet Series Bondi Vet.

On August 6, 2018, CORE Media Group announced the acquisition of The Intellectual Property Corporation, with immediate relaunching of the company as Industrial Media. Eli Holzman of The Intellectual Property Corporation would become IM's new CEO, while IPC's president and co-founder Aaron Saidman would become IM's president while also remaining in his current capacity as president of IPC, CORE's executive chairman Dennis Miller would become Industrial Media's chairman.

Industrial Media era
In March 2019, Industrial Media announced an overall deal with nonfiction production company Momentum Content.

In March 2022, Sony Pictures Television announced that it had agreed to acquire Industrial Media for $350 million. Once the acquisition is finalized, the company's trade name would be referred to as Sony Pictures Television - Nonfiction.

Assets and holdings
Industrial Media's assets and holdings at present included:

19 Entertainment – acquired from Simon Fuller in 2005 for $200 million. 19 owns, among other things, a share of the rights to the Idol series, including Pop Idol in the United Kingdom, American Idol in the United States, and numerous other international versions, and So You Think You Can Dance in the United States.
Sharp Entertainment – acquired 2012
B17 Entertainment – acquired 2013
The Wall – game show airing on NBC since 2017
The Intellectual Property Corporation – acquired 2018

Marketing

CKX
The "C" and "K" in "CKX" stood for "Content is King", representing the focus of the company's business strategy to acquire established content, and then to improve, enhance and develop the marketing of such content. The "X" takes an initial of founder Robert F.X. Sillerman, and is a trademark of many Sillerman companies, such as "SFX Entertainment" and "FXM Asset Management"

References

External links
CKX, Inc. page
CORE Media Group page
Industrial Media page

Entertainment companies established in 2005
Entertainment companies based in New York City
Television production companies of the United States
Sony Pictures Entertainment
Sony Pictures Television
Multinational joint-venture companies
Privately held companies based in New York City
Companies that filed for Chapter 11 bankruptcy in 2016
Companies based in Manhattan
American companies established in 2005
2005 establishments in New York City
2022 mergers and acquisitions
Sony Pictures Television production companies